United Airlines, Inc. (commonly referred to as United) is a major American airline headquartered at the Willis Tower in Chicago, Illinois. United operates a large domestic and international route network spanning cities large and small across the United States and all six inhabited continents. Measured by fleet size and the number of routes, it is the third-largest airline in the world after its merger with Continental Airlines in 2010.

United has eight hubs, with Chicago–O'Hare being its largest in terms of passengers carried and the number of departures. It is a founding member of the Star Alliance, the world's largest airline alliance with a total of 28 member airlines. Regional service is operated by independent carriers under the brand name United Express. The United brand name was established by the amalgamation of several airlines in the late 1920s, the oldest of these being Varney Air Lines, which was founded in 1926.

History

United traces its roots to Varney Air Lines (VAL), which Walter Varney founded in 1926 in Boise, Idaho. Continental Airlines is the successor to Speed Lines, which Varney had founded by 1932 and whose name changed to Varney Speed Lines in 1934. VAL flew the first privately contracted air mail flight in the U.S. on April 6, 1926.

In 1927, William Boeing founded Boeing Air Transport to operate air mail routes under contract with the United States Post Office Department. In 1929, Boeing merged his company with Pratt & Whitney to form the United Aircraft and Transport Corporation (UATC) which then set about buying, in the space of just 28 months, Pacific Air Transport, Stout Air Services, VAL, and National Air Transport, as well as numerous equipment manufacturers at the same time. On March 28, 1931, UATC formed United Air Lines, Inc., as a holding company for its airline subsidiaries.

In December 2002, due largely to the post-9/11 dropoff in air travel, as well as to poor relations between the corporation and one of its key labor unions, the International Association of Machinists, United Airlines filed for bankruptcy. It remained under court protection for more than three years. This enabled it to cut costs ruthlessly. Finally, in early 2006, it emerged from court protection and resumed normal operations.

In late 2006, Continental Airlines and United had preliminary merger discussions. On April 16, 2010, those discussions resumed. The board of directors of Continental and UAL Corporation agreed on May 2, 2010, to combine operations, contingent upon shareholder and regulatory approval. On October 1, 2010, the UAL Corporation changed its name to United Continental Holdings, Inc. The carriers planned to begin merging their operations in 2011. The merged airline began operating under a single air operator's certificate from the Federal Aviation Administration on November 30, 2011. On March 3, 2012, United and Continental merged their passenger service systems, frequent-flier programs, and websites, which virtually eliminated the Continental brand with the exception of its logo. On June 27, 2019, the parent company's name changed from United Continental Holdings to United Airlines Holdings.

In January 2021, Chief Executive Scott Kirby put forward the possibility for the company to mandate employees to receive the COVID-19 vaccine while cautioning the potential difficulties in implementing the mandate. The company was the first major US airline to announce a vaccine mandate for all staff on Aug 6, at which point over 80% of flight attendants and 90% of pilots had been vaccinated, according to statements of the respective unions. Days before the internal deadline of Sept 27, the company announced that more than 97% of the US based staff were vaccinated.

Destinations and hubs

United operates flights to 238 domestic destinations and 118 international destinations in 48 countries or regions across five continents. By spring 2021, United will once again fly regularly to all 6 inhabited continents following the reinstatement of scheduled year-round flights to Africa.

Hubs
As part of its hub-and-spoke business model, United currently operates eight hubs.
Chicago–O'Hare – United's hub for the Midwest and largest hub overall. United controls 47% of the market share in O'Hare, making it the largest carrier at the airport. United's corporate headquarters are also in Chicago.
Denver – United's hub for the Rocky Mountain region of the United States. United has about 42% of the market share in Denver, making it the largest carrier at the airport. By number of flights it has become United's largest hub in 2021.
Guam – United's hub for flight routes in the Pacific region. United has about 98.8% of the market share at Guam International, making it the largest carrier at the airport. Former Continental Airlines hub.
Houston–Intercontinental – United's hub for the Southern United States and primary gateway to Latin America. United currently has about 78% of the seat share at IAH, making it the largest carrier at the airport. Former Continental Airlines hub.
Los Angeles – United's secondary hub for the West Coast and gateway to Asia and Australia. United has 15% of the market share at LAX, making it the third-largest carrier at the airport.
Newark – United's primary hub for the East Coast and gateway to Europe, while including other select flights to Latin America, Africa, and Asia. United has 68% of the market share at Newark, making it the largest carrier at the airport. Former Continental Airlines hub.
San Francisco – United's primary hub for the West Coast and gateway to Asia and Australasia. United has about 46% of the market share at SFO, making it the largest carrier at the airport. 
Washington–Dulles – United's secondary hub for the East Coast and gateway to Europe and Africa. United has about 65% of the market share at Washington Dulles, making it the largest carrier at the airport.

Alliance and codeshare agreements
United Airlines is a member of the Star Alliance and has codeshare agreements with the following airlines:

 Aer Lingus
 Air Canada
 Air China
 Air India
 Air Dolomiti
 Air New Zealand
 All Nippon Airways
 Asiana Airlines
 Austrian Airlines
 Avianca
 Azul Brazilian Airlines
 Boutique Air
 Brussels Airlines
 Cape Air
 Copa Airlines
 Croatia Airlines
 EgyptAir
 Emirates
 Ethiopian Airlines
 Eurowings
 EVA Air
 Hawaiian Airlines
 LOT Polish Airlines
 Lufthansa
 Scandinavian Airlines
 Silver Airways
 Singapore Airlines
 South African Airways
 Swiss International Air Lines
 TAP Air Portugal
 Thai Airways
 Turkish Airlines
 Vistara
 Virgin Australia

Fleet

Current fleet

As of February 2023, United operates a fleet of 879 aircraft with an additional 695 aircraft planned or on order; all of which are either Boeing or Airbus.

Fleet strategy
On July 20, 2011, American Airlines announced an order for 460 narrowbody jets, including 260 Airbus A320s. This order broke Boeing's monopoly with the airline and forced Boeing to proceed with plans for the re-engined 737 MAX. The contract with American included a Most-Favoured-Customer Clause, which requires Airbus to refund to American any difference between the price paid by American and the price paid by United or another airline, if lower. The clause acts to perpetuate United having a Boeing-skewed fleet.

On September 22, 2012, United became the first American airline to take delivery of Boeing 787 aircraft. United is also the North American launch customer for the Boeing 787-9 and 787-10 aircraft, which are stretched versions of the base 787-8 model, delivered at launch.

In May 2018, United planned to replace its 51 Boeing 767s in a deal potentially worth $14 billion at list prices, and was in talks with both Airbus and Boeing, for their A330neo and 787.
United operates 128 757s and 767s ( B757s and 51 B767s), the second-largest combined fleet after Delta Air Lines with 206 ( 757s and  767s). Both have to replace them; they could be replaced by 737 MAX 10s, A321neos, Boeing NMAs, 787-8s or A330-800s.

On June 3, 2021, United announced that a deal had been confirmed with Boom Supersonic to purchase at least 15 of their Overture supersonic airliners & potentially up to 50 in total. These aircraft will be flown on 100% sustainable fuels. The aircraft are intended to enter service with United in 2029 & are expected to be the first supersonic airliners to fly domestically for an airline since the Concorde was retired with British Airways & Air France in 2003.

On June 29, 2021, United announced an order for 270 aircraft valued at around $15 billion: 150 737 MAX 10 aircraft, 50 737 MAX 8 aircraft, and 70 A321neo aircraft. As new aircraft arrive, the airline also announced these will include AVOD (Audio and Video On Demand) screens on every seat, as well as the retrofit of all mainline aircraft to include AVOD screens by 2025. United has also announced the retirement of older mainline aircraft and at least 200 single-class regional aircraft. The 737 MAX 8 aircraft debuts with the airline this summer while 737 MAX 10 and A321neo aircraft start delivery in 2023. United also expects to create 25,000 union jobs, mostly in United States hubs locations, by 2026. The order would be valued at $35.4 billion based on the listed price of the jets.

Cabin

United Polaris Business

Polaris is United's international business class product. The Polaris seat converts into a 6' 6" flatbed, and boasts multiple storage areas, mood lighting, multiple charging ports, lumbar support, and improved dining and amenity services.

The modern Polaris seats can be found on all Boeing 767-300ERs, Boeing 777-300ERs, and Boeing 787 Dreamliners, and internationally configured Boeing 777-200ERs, and are being rolled out on the Boeing 767-400ER. On these aircraft, the cabins are configured to provide aisle access to every passenger, with 767s featuring a 1-1-1 seat configuration while 777s and 787s have a 1-2-1 seat configuration. Boeing 757-200s and most 767-400ERs feature United's older BusinessFirst seats with Polaris branding, with a 2-2 seat configuration on the 757s and 2-1-2 configuration on the 767-400ERs.
 
Polaris passengers check in at separate counters and can use priority security screening where available. In-flight services include pre-departure beverages, table linens and multi-course meals designed in partnership with Charlie Trotter-affiliated chefs via the airline's partnership with the Trotter Project. Passengers are also given priority with boarding and baggage handling and access to the United Polaris Lounge where available, as well as the United Club and partner airline lounges. All Polaris Business seats recline 180 degrees into a full flatbed, all seats face forward.

Other domestic routes, especially hub-to-hub service and certain non "United p.s." transcontinental flights, may see internationally configured aircraft with Polaris seating for operational reasons (such as transferring international aircraft from one hub to another or high demand). While the physical seats and entertainment are the same as on international flights, the service, catering and other amenities are the same as in domestic first class. Unlike routes marketed as United Business, these flights are eligible for Complimentary Premier Upgrades.

Premium Plus is United's premium economy product, featured on most widebody international aircraft. Premium Plus seating offers more space, comfort and amenities compared to United Economy or Economy Plus, and offers upgraded dining on china dinnerware, free alcoholic beverages, a Saks Fifth Avenue blanket and pillow, an amenity kit and more. The first aircraft with these seats were flying in mid-2018, and the full service launched in 2019. During the interim period, these seats were sold as part of Economy Plus.

These seats can be found on almost all widebody aircraft with Polaris seats, with a 2-2-2 seat configuration on Boeing 767s, 2-3-2 on 787s, and 2-4-2 on 777s.

Domestic routes, especially hub-to-hub service may see internationally configured aircraft with United Premium Plus seating for operational reasons. Premium Plus seats are sold as Economy Plus seats. While the physical seats and entertainment are the same as on international flights, the service catering and other amenities are the same as in Economy Plus.

Transcontinental 
United premium transcontinental service is offered on transcontinental flights between Newark and Los Angeles or San Francisco and between Boston and San Francisco. Previously branded as p.s. (short for "Premium Service") when initially launched in 2004, through 2017, these flights utilize primarily Boeing 757-200s, with 180-degrees-flat Polaris seats. The premium cabin also features international-style catering, while all seats have access to inflight wi-fi, on-demand entertainment, and power outlets. Business-class passengers also have access to the United Club at Newark, Boston, Los Angeles, and San Francisco.

All premium transcontinental flights were moved from New York JFK to Newark Liberty Airport on October 25, 2015.

These routes are not eligible for Complimentary Premier upgrades, although MileagePlus members can upgrade using PlusPoints or MileagePlus Upgrade Awards.

United First 
United First is offered on all domestically configured aircraft. When such aircraft are used on international services such as services to Mexico, Central America and the Caribbean (excluding Puerto Rico) destinations, this cabin is branded as United Business. United First seats on narrowbody aircraft have a  seat pitch, while re-configured domestic Boeing 777-200s feature fully-flat-bed seats that alternate facing forward and backwards, similar to the Polaris seats used on the Boeing 757-200s. Passengers receive priority boarding and baggage handling, pre-departure beverages, complimentary meals and separate check-in desks.

In 2015, United released its new domestic first-class seat design. The new leather seats feature cradling headrests, granite cocktail tables, and a tablet stand. These seats debuted on Airbus A319 and Airbus A320 aircraft, and were eventually rolled out on all domestic aircraft.

In 2019, it was announced that United was increasing first and business class seats "by 1,600" across all their aircraft in their fleet, to include the Bombardier CRJ550 for which United is the launch customer of.

Economy Plus
Economy Plus is available on all aircraft. Economy Plus is complimentary for all MileagePlus Premier members. Premier 1K, Platinum and Gold members may select an Economy Plus seat when booking, while Silver members can select an Economy Plus seat at check-in. It can also be purchased depending upon availability by other passengers. Prior to the merger between United and Continental, legacy United aircraft offered Economy Plus, while Continental aircraft did not. Following the merger, Economy Plus was rolled out across the combined fleet.

Economy
Economy Class is available on all aircraft, and usually have a pitch of 31 inches (30 inches on aircraft refurbished with Slimline seats, and 32 inches on Boeing 787s) and a recline of 2–5 inches. All economy seats feature an adjustable headrest and some form of entertainment, ranging from AVOD, inflight wi-fi, personal device entertainment, or DirecTV. Economy seats on Boeing 767, Boeing 777 (except domestic 777-200s), Boeing 787, and 757-200 aircraft feature a personal  touchscreen television at the back of each seat with United Private Screening. On Airbus A319, A320, Boeing 737, Boeing 757-300, and domestically configured Boeing 777 aircraft feature personal device entertainment and WiFi. Some Boeing 737 aircraft feature DirecTV.

Food and snacks are available for purchase on domestic, Caribbean, and some Latin America flights. These include snacks, fresh meals, and snack boxes, depending on flight time and distance. Meals are complimentary on all other international flights. Beverages and small snacks are complimentary in economy class on North America flights. Alcoholic beverages are available for purchase on North America flights but are complimentary on long-haul international flights. On flights where meals are served, a cocktail snack with a beverage is served shortly after takeoff, followed by a main course and dessert. Longer international flights feature a pre-arrival meal, which usually consists of a light breakfast or snack.

Basic Economy
Basic Economy is available on select routes. Intended to be United's lowest fare, Basic Economy fares provide most of the same inflight services and amenities with standard Economy Class. With Basic Economy, group/family seating, seat selection/upgrades and bringing full-sized carry-on bags are not allowed, unless the traveler is a United credit card holder or MileagePlus Premier member. When booking online, it is clearly marked - with a user prompt to confirm the user is booking a Basic Economy fare. Users also have the option to pay a small fee to upgrade their booking to a regular Economy. Also, certain MileagePlus and Premier member benefits are not available, such as Complimentary Premier Upgrades and Premier Qualifying Flights.

Reward services
MileagePlus is the frequent flyer program for United Airlines. Published MileagePlus Premier tiers are Premier 1K, Premier Platinum, Premier Gold, and Premier Silver. Unpublished tiers include United Global Services and Chairman's Circle.

United Club is the airline lounge associated with United Airlines and United Express carriers. The United Club replaced the former United Red Carpet Club and Continental Airlines Presidents Club prior to United Airlines' merger with Continental. United Polaris lounges are also associated with United Airlines for use by select long-haul first and business class travelers on Star Alliance carriers.

Corporate affairs

Ownership and structure
United Airlines, Inc., is publicly traded through its parent company, United Airlines Holdings, Inc., which is a Delaware corporation, on the New York Stock Exchange , with a market capitalization of over US$21 billion as of January 2018. United's operating revenues and operating expenses comprise nearly 100% of the holding company's revenues and operating expenses.

Headquarters and other facilities

United Airlines headquarters are located at the Willis Tower, 233 South Wacker Drive, Chicago, Illinois.

In 2007, United had moved its headquarters from Elk Grove Township, a suburb of Chicago, to 77 West Wacker Drive in the Chicago Loop after receiving US$5.5 million in incentives from the City of Chicago. 
 
Then in 2010, United accepted the City of Chicago's offer of US$35 million in incentives, including a US$10 million grant, for United to move its remaining 2,500 employees out of Elk Grove Township to the Willis Tower (formerly the Sears Tower) in the Chicago Loop. On May 31, 2012, United opened its operations center, which occupied twelve floors there.
In 2019 United renewed its lease at Willis Tower, originally ending in 2028 and now set to expire in 2033, and plans to construct a roof deck and a  dining hall on the fourth floor.

The former headquarters campus at Elk Grove Township was gradually annexed into the Village of Mount Prospect, and serves as an IT operations facility, with a new  data center constructed in 2013.

United maintains a large presence in downtown Houston, having leased  of space (seven floors) for occupancy in 2017.

United has training facilities for its flight crews in Denver and Houston, a major aircraft maintenance center in San Francisco, and call centers in Houston and Chicago.

On September 24, 2020, United Airlines announced that it will roll out a new COVID-19 testing program for passengers from October 15 that year. Initially, testing was only available for passengers traveling to Hawaii from San Francisco International Airport.

Corporate identity

Brand image

The pre-merger United logo, commonly nicknamed the "tulip", was developed in the early 1970s by the designer Saul Bass as part of a new brand image. The logo represented the airline's monogram as well as a modernized version of the airline's shield logo which had been adopted in the 1930s, but fell out of use by the late 1960s. The ribbon-like rendering has also been said to symbolize the motion of flight.

Marketing themes

United's earliest slogan, "The Main Line Airway", emphasized its signature New York-Chicago-San Francisco route, and was replaced in 1965 with "Fly the Friendly Skies", which was in use until 1996 in its first iteration. The "It's time to fly" slogan was created in 2004. After the merger of United and Continental in October 2010, the slogan changed to "Let's fly together" until September 2013, when United announced a return of the "Fly the Friendly Skies" slogan in an ad campaign to start the following day. The resurrected slogan would be accompanied by the 1924 George Gershwin song "Rhapsody in Blue" as its theme song, and a voiceover provided by Matt Damon.

"Rhapsody" would have entered the public domain in 2000, but the Copyright Term Extension Act of 1998 extended its copyright another 20 years until January 1, 2020, when it officially entered on the Public Domain.
United announced that it would continue to use "Rhapsody in Blue" as its theme song following the merger with Continental.

Environmental initiatives
Because over 98 percent of United's greenhouse gas emissions are from jet fuel, its environmental strategy has focused on operational fuel efficiency initiatives and investments in sustainably produced, low-carbon alternative fuels.

On August 23, 2011, United Continental Holdings, Inc., announced a conversion to paperless flight decks and projected that by the end of the year, 11,000 iPads will have been deployed to all United and Continental pilots. The green benefits include reductions in paper use, printing, and fuel consumption.

On November 7, 2011, United flew the world's first commercial aviation flight on a microbially-derived biofuel. The aircraft was fueled with 40 percent Solajet, which is Solazyme's algae-derived renewable jet fuel, and 60 percent petroleum-derived jet fuel. This flight was operated by the Eco-Skies Boeing 737-800 aircraft from Houston to Chicago-O'Hare.

On January 15, 2013, Aviation Partners Boeing (APB), a joint venture between Aviation Partners Inc. and Boeing, announced that United had agreed to replace the Blended Winglets on its Boeing Next Generation 737 aircraft with APB's Split Scimitar Winglet (SSW), significantly reducing drag. Once the SSWs are installed, it is estimated that APB's winglet technology will save United more than $250 million annually in fuel costs.

On June 30, 2015, United invested US$30 million in Fulcrum BioEnergy, an alternative fuel company. Fulcrum's alternative fuel is produced through a clean and efficient thermochemical process and reduces lifecycle carbon emissions by more than 80 percent. As part of its investment, United will work with Fulcrum to develop up to five alternative fuel refineries near its U.S. hubs.

On March 11, 2016, United became the first airline in the world to fly on commercial-scale quantities of such fuels on a continuous basis, which were procured from AltAir Fuels. This fuel was produced from sustainable feedstocks such as non-edible natural oils and agricultural wastes and is expected to provide a greater than 60 percent reduction in carbon dioxide emissions on a lifecycle basis when compared to traditional jet fuel.

In 2016, United began partnering with Clean the World to repurpose items from the airline's international premium class amenity kits and donate the hygiene products to those in critical need. Clean the World provides hygiene education and soap to promote handwashing, which helps prevent hygiene-related deaths. During the first year of this partnership, United expected to divert  of material that otherwise would have gone to landfills.

In 2017 United started a partnership with Audubon International to protect raptors—including hawks, ospreys and owls—in and around New York-area airports and resettle the birds-of-prey at suitable golf course habitats where the species are more likely to thrive.

Worker relations
All United Airlines pilots are represented by the Air Line Pilots Association. A new Joint Collective Bargaining Agreement was ratified by a majority of the United/Continental pilots on December 15, 2012, which struck down a scope clause that disallowed Continental from outsourcing the flying of regional jets with 70 or more passenger seats.

In January 2021, as a plan to reduce its costs in 2023, United Airlines offered its employees voluntary leave options with pay or health benefits.

In April 2021, United Airlines announced that within the next decade, half its pilot cadets in the United Aviate Academy would be female or people of color.

Accidents and incidents
Source: United Airlines Accidents and Incidents History at Aviation Safety Network.

Controversies and passenger incidents

Animal transport
In 2013, after pressure from PETA, United announced that it would no longer transport monkeys to laboratories. United was the last North American passenger airline to transport these animals to laboratories. United flies more animals and has longer flight stage length than any other US airline, and accounted for one third of animal deaths of US airlines between 2012 and 2017.

Effective March 20, 2018, the PetSafe program was suspended with no new reservations for cargo transport of pets accepted. This came after United announced plans to mark pet carriers in the passenger cabin with bright tags and legislation was introduced in the United States House of Representatives and United States Senate banning the placement of pets in overhead compartments. This was in response to a dog death after a passenger placed it in the overhead compartment following flight attendant instructions, but the flight attendant denied knowing that the luggage contained a dog.

Cyber security issues
United awarded airline miles as "bug bounties" to hackers who could identify gaps in the carrier's web security. Two hackers have each been rewarded with 1 million miles of air travel as of July 15, 2015. This cybersecurity program was announced a few weeks after the company experienced two software glitches. The first incident delayed 150 United flights on June 2 due to a problem with its flight dispatching system. Six days later, United's reservation system delayed flights by not allowing passengers to check-in. In addition to the "bug bounty" program, United said it tests systems internally and engages cybersecurity firms.

Privacy concerns
In February 2019, privacy concerns arose after it emerged that United had installed cameras in some seat backs. United said that the cameras were "not activated", but journalists reported that malicious hackers could still potentially enable the cameras to spy on passengers.

Mail-scan fraud 
In February 2021, United Airlines was fined $49 million by the Department of Justice on charges of fraud on postal service contracts for transportation of international mail. According to investigators, between 2012 and 2015 United submitted delivery scan data to make it appear that United and its partner airlines complied with International Commercial Air requirements with accurate delivery times when in fact they were automated delivery scans with aspirational delivery time. Some employees within United worked to hide this fact from the USPS.

Flight 976

United Airlines Flight 976 was a regularly scheduled flight from Ministro Pistarini International Airport, Buenos Aires to John F. Kennedy International Airport, New York City on October 19, 1995. Prior to takeoff, an investment banker became disruptive after consuming two glasses of champagne, began threatening crew members and attempted to pour his own drinks, against airline and federal regulations. After takeoff, the banker  was served two more glasses of red wine, after which the crew refused to serve him more alcohol due to his apparent intoxication. When his requests for more alcohol were denied, he pushed over a female flight attendant, climbed onto a service trolley, took off his pants and defecated, used linen napkins as toilet paper, wiped his hands on various service counters and tracked feces throughout the aircraft, after which he entered a lavatory and locked himself in. 
A request to divert to Luis Muñoz Marín International Airport in San Juan, Puerto Rico, was denied due to the security risks created by the presence of  the President of Portugal Mário Soares, Argentinian foreign minister Guido di Tella and their security details on the flight. The disruptive passenger was arrested by the FBI after landing in New York and charged with interfering with a flight crew and threatening a flight attendant. He later pleaded guilty to the latter charge and was fined $5,000 (having previously agreed to reimburse the airline for its cleanup costs and all the other passengers their airfare, which amounted to nearly $50,000) and given two years' probation The incident was later dubbed the worst ever case of air rage.

2017 passenger removal

On the evening of April 9, 2017, a passenger was forcibly removed by law enforcement from United Airlines flight 3411 at Chicago-O'Hare, bound for Louisville. United announced that it needed four seats for airline staff on the sold-out flight. When no passengers volunteered after being offered vouchers worth $800, United staff selected four passengers to leave. Three of them did so, but the fourth, a doctor named David Dao, declined as he said that he had patients to treat the following morning. He was pulled from his seat by Chicago Department of Aviation security officers and dragged by his arms down the aisle. Dao sustained a concussion, broken teeth and a broken nose among other injuries. The incident was captured on smartphone cameras and posted on social media, triggering angry public backlash. Afterwards, United's then-chief executive officer, Oscar Munoz, described Dao as "disruptive and belligerent", apologized for "re-accommodating" the paying customers, and defended and praised staff for "following established procedures". He was widely criticized as "tone-deaf". Munoz later issued a second statement calling what happened a "truly horrific event" and accepting "full responsibility" for it. After a lawsuit, Dao reached an undisclosed settlement with United and airport police. In the aftermath, United's board of directors decided that Munoz would not become its chairman and that executive compensation would be tied to customer satisfaction. Following this incident, passenger complaints increased by 70 percent.

See also
 United Breaks Guitars
 Air transport in the United States
 Transportation in the United States

References

Bibliography

External links

 
 Hemispheres inflight magazine
 United Vacations
 UAL.com Official website archive

 
Airlines for America members
Airlines established in 1926
Companies based in Chicago
Companies that filed for Chapter 11 bankruptcy in 2002
Star Alliance
1926 establishments in Idaho
Airlines based in Illinois
American companies established in 1926